Abu-al-Hasan Ali ben Abdallah al-Nuymari as-Shushtari or Al-Sustari (1212 in Exfiliana, near Guadix – 1269 in Damietta) was an Andalusian-Arab Sufi Sheikh, philosopher, jurist, and poet. He is best known by posterity for his poetry, which was designed to be sung in songs employing simple monorhymes to praise God with everyday musical idiom, which won wide recognition beyond the hundreds of disciples in his own Shushtariyya brotherhood.

Many verses of al-Shushtari's poetry (62 short poems called "Tawshih") were identified in the classical Andalusian music that is today sung in North Africa as well as other parts of the Greater Middle East. In the Mashriq (the orient), he is remembered today for his poem A little sheikh from the land of Meknes (Arabic شويخ من أرض مكناس, "Shewiyekh men-ard Meknes") a song which retains huge popularity to this day.

Recordings
Ritual sufí andalusí, al-Shushtari, Omar Metioui, Eduardo Paniagua, Madrid, Pneuma, 1998
Dhikr y sama':canto religioso de la cofradía sufí-andalusí al-Shushtari. Poemas del místico al-Shushtari, Omar Metioui, Eduardo Paniagua, Madrid, Pneuma, 1998.

References

1212 births
1269 deaths
Sufi poets
Sufis from al-Andalus
13th-century writers from al-Andalus